H. H. Bonniwell (1860-1935) was a member of the Minnesota Senate.

Biography
Bonniwell was born on May 13, 1860 in Mequon, Wisconsin. His father, William T. Bonniwell, Jr., also served in the Senate, as well as the Wisconsin State Assembly and the Minnesota House of Representatives. Bonniwell died on April 28, 1935 and is buried in Hutchinson, Minnesota.

Career
Bonniwell was a member of the Senate from 1915 to 1935. Additionally, he was a delegate to the 1912 Democratic National Convention.

References

People from Mequon, Wisconsin
Democratic Party Minnesota state senators
1860 births
1935 deaths